The Calcutta Cricket & Football Club (CC&FC) (formally named as Calcutta Cricket Club) is a multisports club based in Kolkata, West Bengal, India. Founded in 1792 as a cricket institution, the football and rugby sections were added when it merged with Calcutta FC (oldest association football club in Asia, founded in 1872) in 1965.

History
Founded as one of the earliest European clubs in Calcutta, British India, Calcutta FC introduced rugby in the country. They later started playing association football and have enjoyed rivalry with fully indigenous clubs, primarily Mohun Bagan. Sports currently practised at the CC&FC include: cricket, football, field hockey, rugby, cycle polo and tennis. The football team currently competes in the Premier Division B of the Calcutta Football League, conducted by the Indian Football Association (IFA).

The club's cricket and football teams participates in their respective divisions as "Calcutta Cricket Club" for cricket and "Calcutta Football Club" for football. Their hockey and rugby teams participate under the combined name of "Calcutta Cricket and Football Club".

Departments

Cricket

The Club was founded as the "Calcutta Cricket Club Clippers" by British expatriates who had come over with the British East India Company. Have been in existence since 1792, it is the second oldest cricket club in the world after Marylebone Cricket Club. On 23 February 1792, Madras Courier reported the schedule of match between Calcutta Cricket Club and a team from Barrackpore, and the news was later highlighted by Irwin Rosenwater on The London Times.

During its first years of existence, the Calcutta Cricket Club played its home games near river Hooghly but it was not until 1841 when the institution got land to establish its venue. In 1889–90, the club came into limelight when Marylebone Cricket Club came to play in Calcutta by responding to the club's invitation, which was the first visit of a foreign team to play cricket in India. It was later merged with the Calcutta Football Club (incorporated in 1872, where both footballs — rugby and association were practised) and the Ballygunge Cricket Club over the years to become the "Calcutta Cricket and Football Club" in 1965.

CCFC is currently under the jurisdiction of Cricket Association of Bengal (CAB), and competes in the CAB First Division League, J.C. Mukherjee T-20 Trophy and other regional tournaments. Club's cricket section is currently headquartered in 19/1, Garcha 1st Lane, Ballygunge, Kolkata.

Rugby union

In the British Raj, Rugby union was introduced and emerged as second most popular winter sport after association football. At the ground of CFC, first recorded match was played in 1872. In 1874, the club joined Rugby Football Union. As the rugby section became defunct in later years, the sport came back at the CC&FC in 1884. In 1890, an inter club trophy was incepted by the club, named Calcutta Rugby Union Challenge Cup (known simply as Calcutta Cup), and its second division trophy was clinched by the club.

Football

Run by the British, Calcutta Football Club was once one of the leading football teams and had a great rivalry specially with Mohun Bagan. The team for the first time was defeated by Mohun Bagan in 1923 in the return leg of CFL, but managed to clinch both the league and IFA Shield titles in that season. Other rivals of the club were Mohammedan Sporting, Aryan and Dalhousie.

Calcutta FC won the prestigious Calcutta Football League (CFL) eight times, and the IFA Shield nine times before merging to the Calcutta Cricket Club.

Field hockey
CC&FC's hockey team is known as CCFC Gremlins, and is affiliated with the Bengal Hockey Association (often shortened to 'Hockey Bengal'). Once consisting of Anglo-Indian players, the team is currently participating in Calcutta Hockey League, and Beighton Cup (which is one of world's oldest field hockey tournaments).

Home ground
There was absence of permanent venue for the club. They used grounds in Esplanade, parallel with the river Hooghly, between Fort William and Government House. In 1825, 'Sketch of the Maidan' was done by the club, and in 1841, they were allowed to enclose the ground. The club later used Auckland Circus Gardens.

The club later played its home games at the Calcutta FC ground in Kolkata Maidan, now known as Mohun Bagan Ground. It was used as venue of the 1954 edition of Quadrangular Series.

Notable members

A large number of notable athletes are associated with the club, including:
 Football: Chuni Goswami, Subhas Bhowmick, S. Bhattacharjee, Pradip Choudhury, P. Ganguly, Santo Mitra, Shyam Thapa, Kiyan Nassiri.
 Hockey: Keshav Chandra Datt, Gurbux Singh, Dr. Vece Paes, Anand Mandapaka.
 Cricket: Punya B. Datta, Ashok Gandotra Devang Gandhi, Sourav Ganguly, Saba Karim, Arun Lal, Pranab Roy, Biswajit Bhowmick.
 Tennis: Chiradip Mukerjea, Enrico Piperno, Leander Paes.

Honours

Football

As Calcutta FC
 Calcutta Football League
Champions (8): 1899, 1907, 1916, 1918, 1920, 1922, 1923, 1925
IFA Shield
Champions (9): 1896, 1900, 1903, 1904, 1906, 1915, 1922, 1923, 1924
Runners-up (8): 1905, 1907, 1910, 1914, 1916, 1919, 1921, 1936
 Trades Cup
Champions (1): 2004
 Minto Fort Cup
Runners-up (1): 1906

Hockey

As Calcutta FC
 Beighton Cup
Champions (1): 1924
Runners-up (1): 1919

Rugby
 All India & South Asia Rugby Tournament
Runners-up: 1932

See also

History of Cricket in India
Football in Kolkata
History of Indian football
List of football clubs in India

Footnotes

Further reading

Dutta, P. L., Memoir of 'Father of Indian Football' Nagendraprasad Sarbadhikary (Calcutta: N. P. Sarbadhikary Memorial Committee, 1944) (hereafter Memoir)

Ghosh, Saurindra Kumar. Krira Samrat Nagendraprasad Sarbadhikary 1869–1940 (Calcutta: N. P. Sarbadhikary Memorial Committee, 1963) (hereafter Krira Samrat).
Roselli, John. Self Image of Effeteness: Physical Education and Nationalism in Nineteenth Century Bengal. Past & Present (journal). 86 (February 1980). p. 121–48.
Sinha, Mrinalini. Colonial Masculinity, The Manly Englishman and the Effeminate Bengali in the Late Nineteenth Century (Manchester: Manchester University Press, 1995).
Chatterjee, Partha. The Nation and Its Fragments: Colonial and Post-colonial Histories (Calcutta: Oxford University Press, 1995).
Mason, Football on the Maidan, p. 144; Dimeo, Football and Politics in Bengal, p. 62.

From recreation to competition: Early history of Indian football . pp. 124–141. Published online: 6 Aug 2006. www.tandfonline.com. Retrieved 30 June 2021.

References

External links
 
 
 

Cricket in Kolkata
Indian club cricket teams
Sports clubs established in the 1790s
Rugby union in India
Football clubs in Kolkata
Sports clubs in India
Multi-sport clubs in India
Indian field hockey clubs
Indian rugby union teams
Defunct cricket grounds in India
1792 establishments in India